The Dr. Nathan and Lula Cass House, also known as the Magnolia House, is a historic octagon house located at 502 N. Travis Avenue in  Cameron, Texas, United States. On February 8, 1991, it was added to the National Register of Historic Places. Built in 1885, it is now the Magnolia Inn.

See also

National Register of Historic Places listings in Milam County, Texas
Recorded Texas Historic Landmarks in Milam County

References

External links

Houses completed in 1885
Houses in Milam County, Texas
Houses on the National Register of Historic Places in Texas
Octagon houses in the United States
National Register of Historic Places in Milam County, Texas
Recorded Texas Historic Landmarks